Walter Kraft (Cologne, 9 June 1905 – Amsterdam, 9 May 1977) was a German organist and composer, best known for his remarkably long tenure (almost half a century, 1926–72) at the Marienkirche, Lübeck.

During this tenure, Kraft, who had been a student of Paul Hindemith in Berlin, revived the practice of evening concerts of sacred works. Such concerts, collectively called Abendmusik, had been regularly given by his predecessors at the church, notably Dietrich Buxtehude and Franz Tunder; but they had ceased in 1810, mainly due to the dislocation caused to northern Germany by the Napoleonic wars.

Kraft made numerous commercial recordings (primarily for the Vox label) during the LP era, most of which have been reissued on compact disc and as mp3s. As well as recording Handel's 12 organ concertos, he was among the first to commit to disc the entire solo organ music (or what was believed to be at the time) of Bach and Buxtehude. His discography also included pieces by more obscure German baroque musicians such as Nikolaus Bruhns.

Like his younger contemporary Anton Heiller, Kraft also composed a fair amount (mostly organ music but also an oratorio called Christus), though as with Heiller, his fame as a performer completely upstaged his hopes of lasting renown as a creator. Once he retired in 1972 from the Marienkirche post, he apparently planned to write an opera, but never finished any such work.

He died along with 32 others when Amsterdam's Hotel Polen caught fire.

Organ Compositions:
Te deum for 2 organs (1943) [manuscript only]
Partita on a song of Schuetz [Baerenreiter, 1949]
Toccata on 'Ite missa est' [Schott, 1970]
Prelude in G [Eulenburg, 1970]
Fantasia on Three Easter Songs [Amadeus, 1974]
Totentanz-Toccata [Amadeus, 1974]
Triptychon on 'St. Michael' [Schott, 1975]
Fantasie 'Media vita in morte sumus' [Amadeus]
Five Short Organ Pieces [Amadeus]

Organ with Instruments:
Prelude, Pastorale & Chaconne, flute & organ [Amadeus, 1947]
Concerto for organ & chamber orchestra (1963) [manuscript only]
Metaphern, violin & organ [Hanssler, 1979]

References

1905 births
1977 deaths
German classical organists
German male organists
Musicians from Lübeck
People from the Rhine Province
20th-century classical musicians
Deaths from fire
Accidental deaths in the Netherlands
20th-century German male musicians
20th-century German musicians
Male classical organists